Sune Eriksson (born 19 March 1939) is a politician who served as the Premier of Åland Islands, an autonomous and unilingually Swedish territory of Finland.

Minister of social affairs and environment 2001-2003
Speaker, Ålands lagting (Åland parliament) 1999-2000
1st deputy speaker 1995-1999
Premier (lantråd) 1988-1991
Member of Ålands lagting (the Åland parliament) 1979-1999

References

1939 births
Living people
Premiers of Åland
Speakers of the Parliament of Åland
Members of the Parliament of Åland
Politicians from Åland